That Night in Varennes is a 1982 French-Italian drama film directed by Ettore Scola. It is based on a novel by Catherine Rihoit. It tells the story of a fictional meeting among Restif de la Bretonne, Giacomo Casanova, Thomas Paine and Sophie de la Borde (a lady in waiting to the queen). They are all traveling together in a coach that is a few hours behind the one that is carrying King Louis XVI and Marie Antoinette in their flight to Varennes during the French Revolution.

The film was entered into the 1982 Cannes Film Festival. The film was nominated for Best Foreign Language Film by the U.S. National Board of Review of Motion Pictures.

Selected cast
Jean-Louis Barrault as Nicolas Edmé Restif de la Bretonne
Marcello Mastroianni as Casanova, Chevalier de Seingalt
Hanna Schygulla as Countess Sophie de la Borde
Harvey Keitel as Thomas Paine
Jean-Claude Brialy as Monsieur Jacob
Andréa Ferréol as Madame Adélaïde Gagnon
Michel Vitold as De Florange
Laura Betti as Virginia Capacelli
Pierre Malet as Emile Delage, student revolutionary
 Enzo Jannacci as the Italian clown 
 Daniel Gélin as De Wendel
 Didi Perego as Madame Sauce
 Caterina Boratto as Madame Faustine 
 Dora Doll as Nanette Precy 
 Hugues Quester as Jean-Louis Romeuf
 Jean-Louis Trintignant as Monsieur Sauce
 Michel Piccoli as King Louis XVI

References

External links

1982 films
1980s historical drama films
Films based on French novels
French historical drama films
Italian historical drama films
1980s French-language films
French Revolution films
Films directed by Ettore Scola
Films scored by Armando Trovajoli
Films set in the 1790s
Cultural depictions of Giacomo Casanova
Cultural depictions of Thomas Paine
Cultural depictions of Louis XVI
Cultural depictions of Marie Antoinette
1982 drama films
Films with screenplays by Ettore Scola
1980s Italian films
1980s French films